"Friday" is the sixth and final single from British singer Daniel Bedingfield's debut album, Gotta Get Thru This (2002). It peaked at number 28 on the UK Singles Chart and number 49 on the Irish Singles Chart.

Track listings
UK CD1
 "Friday" (radio edit)
 "James Dean (I Wanna Know)" (live Radio 2 session)
 "Friday" (Solaris vocal edit)
 "Friday" (video)

UK CD2
 "Friday" (live Radio 2 session)
 "Never Gonna Leave Your Side" (live Radio 2 session)
 "Blown It Again" (Peggy remix)

UK cassette single
 "Friday" (radio edit)
 "Friday" (Roni Size mix)

Charts

References

2002 songs
2003 singles
Daniel Bedingfield songs
Polydor Records singles
Songs written by Daniel Bedingfield